Slamming is the impact of the bottom structure of a ship onto the sea surface.

Slamming may also refer to:

 Intravenous drug use
 Telephone slamming, a telecommunications scam
 Domain slamming, an Internet domain name scam
 Poetry slamming, a kind of competition for poets